The Geelong & District Football League (GDFNL) is an Australian rules football and netball league in Victoria, being the oldest surviving competition in the region. It is one of three leagues in the Geelong area, the others being the Geelong FNL and the Bellarine FNL.

There are 12 teams competing in the GDFL, which has also produced over 600 VFL/AFL players.

History
The league was formed in 1879 as the Geelong and District Football Association (GDFA). In 1919 it changed name to the GDFL, before changing to the Geelong Junior Football Association in 1922. It reverted to the GDFL name in 1933, then back to the GDFA in 1939, and back to the GDFL in 1945. From 1922 until 1927, the league operated and administrated the Geelong Association Football Club, which competed in the Victorian Football Association.

From 1946 onwards, the GDFL maintained a divisional system, with clubs in the First Division competing for the Evelyn Hurst Trophy, the Second Division for the Woolworth Cup, and the Third Division for the Jarman Cup.

In 1973 the GDFL had a restructure that insisted in having the senior club also provide a reserve grade side. This meant that senior clubs had to align with a junior club to survive. The Evelyn Hurst Trophy, the Woolworth Cup and the Jarman Cup titles were dropped for the more standard 1st and 2nd divisions. 1st division would have twelve clubs while 2nd division started with 8 and eventually grew to 11 clubs.

The league took the form it is today when 12 clubs broke away in 1979 to form the Geelong Football League. The city and country clubs of the old GDFL were divided into the major league competition of the GFL and the minor league GDFL. Many of the teams in the lower league wanted a system of promotion and relegation, which saw the movement of a couple of clubs.

The GDFL were left with 11 clubs but over the next couple of years it grew to fourteen. It was enough for the league add another division of competition.  From 1984 until 1995 the league had two divisions that operated on a promotion/demotion system. From 1996 onwards, the league has reverted to a single division competition.

Today the GDFL is opposed to the promotion-relegation system, with the Geelong Football League, Geelong & District Football League and Bellarine Football League forming a three-league, three-division football structure in the Geelong area. From 2002, the GDFL included netball teams, introducing A Grade, B Grade & C Grade senior teams, as well as U/17's, U/15's & U/13's netball.

In 2009, the GDFL introduced a fourth senior netball section, D Grade, in which East Geelong and Werribee Centrals have each won three of the last six premierships.

Clubs

Current clubs

Recent premierships

	1945	Geelong West
 Evelyn Hurst Trophy
	1946	East Geelong
	1947	East Geelong
	1948	East Geelong
	1949	North Geelong
	1950	North Geelong
	1951	North Geelong
	1952	North Geelong
	1953	North Geelong
	1954	North Geelong
	1955	North Geelong
	1956	St Marys
	1957	Barwon
	1958	North Geelong
	1959	St Marys
	1960	St Marys
	1961	Barwon
	1962	Newtown & Chilwell
	1963	Newtown & Chilwell
	1964	Newtown & Chilwell
	1965	Newtown & Chilwell
	1966	Geelong West C&FC
	1967	St Marys
	1968	North Geelong
	1969	North Geelong
	1970	East Geelong
	1971	Geelong West C&FC
	1972	St Marys
 1st Division
	1973	East Geelong
	1974	North Shore
	1975	St Marys
	1976	North Shore
	1977	North Shore
	1978	Newtown & Chilwell
	1979	Modewarre
	1980	St Peters
	1981	St Peters

	1982	St Josephs
	1983	Thomson
	1984	St Josephs
	1985	Geelong Amateurs
	1986	Lara
	1987	Werribee Central
	1988	Lara
	1989	Werribee Central
	1990	North Geelong
	1991	Anakie
	1992	North Geelong
	1993	North Geelong
	1994	Anakie
	1995	Corio
	1996	Thomson
	1997	Bannockburn
	1998	Bannockburn
	1999	Werribee Central
	2000	Werribee Central
	2001	Werribee Central
	2002	North Geelong
	2003	Bannockburn
	2004	Werribee Central
	2005	Thomson
	2006	Thomson
	2007	Belmont
	2008	Thomson
	2009	East Geelong
	2010	Bell Post Hill
	2011	Bell Post Hill
	2012	Bell Post Hill
       2013    North Geelong
       2014    Bell Post Hill
       2015    Bell Post Hill
       2016    Bell Post Hill
       2017    Bell Post Hill
       2018    Thomson
       2019    Bannockburn
       2020 League in recess due to COVID19 pandemic 

 Woolworths Cup	
	1946	Sea Scouts
	1947	Portarlington
	1948	North Shore
	1949	St Albans
	1950	Freshwater Ck
	1951	Freshwater Ck
	1952	Lara
	1953	Geelong Amateurs
	1954	St Albans
	1955	North Geelong
	1956	North Geelong
	1957	North Geelong
	1958	North Geelong
	1959	North Geelong
	1960	Modewarre
	1961	Inverleigh
	1962	Torquay
	1963	Drysdale
	1964	Thomson
	1965	Lara
	1966	Drysdale
	1967	Anakie
	1968	St Albans
	1969	Drysdale
	1970	Drysdale
	1971	St Albans
	1972	St Albans
 2nd Division
	1973	Modewarre
	1974	Modewarre
	1975	Grovedale
	1976	Modewarre
	1977	Grovedale
	1978	Geelong West C&FC

	1979-1983 single division	
	1984	Werribee Central
	1985	Anakie
	1986	Thomson
	1987	Geelong West C&FC
	1988	North Geelong
	1989	Modewarre
	1990	Bannockburn
	1991	Thomson
	1992	Leigh Districts
	1993	Eastern Suburbs
	1994	Modewarre
	1995	Thomson
Jarman Cup
	1952	Modewarre
	1953	Portarlington
	1954	Modewarre
	1955	Drysdale
	1956	Geelong West C&FC
	1957	Barwon Heads Ocean Grove
	1958	Portarlington
	1959	Portarlington
	1960	Torquay
	1961	Torquay
	1962	Drysdale
	1963	Marshall-Grovedale
	1964	St Albans
	1965	Newtown & Chilwell
	1966	East Geelong
	1967	Barwon
	1968	St Marys
	1969	Bell Park
	1970	Bell Park
	1971	Newtown & Chilwell
	1972	St Marys

References

External links
 Official Twitter
 SportsTG website
 GDFL on AFL Barwon
 GDFL Netball

 
Australian rules football competitions in Victoria (Australia)
Netball leagues in Victoria (Australia)